"ER2" is a single by Japanese boy band Kanjani Eight as Eight Ranger. It was released on August 6, 2014. It debuted in number one on the weekly Oricon Singles Chart and reached number one on the Billboard Japan Hot 100. It was the 27th best-selling single of 2014 in Japan, with 241,824 copies.

References 

2014 singles
2014 songs
Japanese film songs
Japanese-language songs
Kanjani Eight songs
Oricon Weekly number-one singles
Billboard Japan Hot 100 number-one singles
Song articles with missing songwriters